Los Angeles Football Club, commonly referred to as LAFC, is an American professional soccer team based in Los Angeles. The club competes in Major League Soccer (MLS) as a member club of the league's Western Conference. The club was established on October 30, 2014, and began play during the 2018 season as an expansion team. The club plays their home matches at BMO Stadium, a soccer-specific stadium located in Exposition Park.

The managing owners of the club are Brandon Beck, Larry Berg, and Bennett Rosenthal. Los Angeles FC also has a variety of other part-owners, such as Will Ferrell. The club's inaugural head coach was Bob Bradley, who served from 2017 to 2021. During their second season in 2019, Los Angeles FC won the Supporters' Shield with club captain Carlos Vela earning the MVP Award. In 2020, Los Angeles FC were the runners-up in the CONCACAF Champions League.  The club won their first MLS Cup in 2022, which completed a league double with their second Supporters' Shield.

Since they started playing, Los Angeles FC have had a fierce rivalry with the LA Galaxy, the older of the two Los Angeles-based MLS teams. The rivalry between the two clubs has been dubbed El Tráfico by the supporters of both clubs.

History

On October 30, 2014, Major League Soccer awarded a new expansion team to Los Angeles. On September 15, 2015, the club announced that Los Angeles Football Club, which had previously been used as a placeholder name for the club, would be the official team name. Henry Nguyen, Los Angeles FC's principal owner at the time, hinted at this possibility shortly after the club was announced in describing the name as "timeless".

LAFC announced Bob Bradley as its head coach in July 2017, joining general director John Thorrington in a search for players. Mexican forward Carlos Vela was signed as the club's first designated player on August 11, 2017.

On March 4, 2018, LAFC played its first MLS game, a 1–0 win against Seattle Sounders FC at CenturyLink Field in Seattle. LAFC designated player Diego Rossi scored the club's first-ever competitive goal in the 11th minute, assisted by Vela.

On March 31, 2018, LAFC suffered its first MLS loss, giving up a 3–0 lead to lose 4–3 to LA Galaxy in the MLS debut of Zlatan Ibrahimović. LAFC was the second team ever to lose an MLS game after leading 3–0 during the match. Despite the loss, LAFC won 4 of the 6 games on their road trip to start the season, becoming the first team to earn 12 points from a season opening road trip of 6 games or more. They finished the season with 7 road wins which is the most for an expansion team in the post-shootout era.

LAFC accomplished the best regular season for an MLS expansion team, earning 57 points. The total surpassed the 56 picked up the 1998 Chicago Fire, also coached by Bob Bradley, as well as the post-shootout era record of 55 set in 2017 by Atlanta United. LAFC's seven road wins also tied for the most ever by an expansion team in the pre or post shootout-era with the '98 Fire who had two road wins come via the shootout. They finished second all-time in goals scored by an expansion team in a season, with 68, just behind Atlanta's 70.

On October 6, 2018, LAFC clinched its first playoff spot after a 3–0 victory against the Colorado Rapids finishing third in the West, but were knocked out at home in the first round in a 3–2 loss to sixth-place Real Salt Lake.

2020 CONCACAF Champions League
Los Angeles FC appeared in CONCACAF Champions League for the first time in 2020. After going down 2–0 in the first leg against Club León, LAFC came back and won 3-0 in the second leg, advancing (3-2 on aggregate) to the round of 16. Shortly after that, due to the Covid-19 pandemic, the tournament was put on hold.  When the tournament resumed in December, under a new one-off format, Los Angeles FC defeated Cruz Azul (2-1) after going down 1-0. In the semi-finals LAFC defeated Club América (3–1), again in comeback fashion. They became the third MLS side to advance to the Final, where they were defeated by Tigres UANL (2–1), who had been runners-up in previous editions of the tournament, and who went on to become the runners-up in the Club World Cup.

2022 MLS Cup Champions
LAFC spent the majority of the 2022 MLS season pushing for the league's all-time points record (73, set the previous year), but major squad turnover brought about a string of losses (five in their final nine matches) which led to LAFC settling for 67 points as they won their second Supporters' Shield. This total was equal with the Philadelphia Union, who lost the Shield on a wins tiebreaker. LAFC defeated their archrivals, the Galaxy, 3–2 in the conference semifinals before knocking out Austin FC 3–0 to advance to their first-ever MLS Cup. Los Angeles FC won the 2022 MLS Cup by defeating the Union in a penalty shootout following a 3–3 draw through extra time. The two latest goals in MLS Cup Playoffs history were scored in the match, with Gareth Bale scoring an equalizer in the 128th minute to take the match to penalties, which LAFC won 3-0. LAFC substitute goalkeeper John McCarthy made two saves in the shootout and was named the most valuable player of the match.

Colors, badge, and sponsorship
The club's colors and logo were unveiled on January 7, 2016, at Union Station. The club's primary colors are black and gold, with red and gray used as accent colors. The Art Deco-inspired logo incorporates a shield outline referencing the city seal, with a winged "LA" monogram and the words "Los Angeles" and "Football Club" in Neutraface. The crest was designed by Matthew Wolff.

Sponsorship

On January 31, 2018, LAFC announced that YouTube TV would be the club's first official shirt sponsor in addition to exclusively broadcasting the club's local matches in English. Target was announced as their first sleeve sponsor in October 2019.

On March 26, 2021, upon the expiration of its sponsorship contract with YouTube TV, LAFC announced that FLEX, a power tool manufacturer headquartered in Steinheim an der Murr, Germany, would replace YouTube TV as the main shirt sponsor for the club.  Four days later, on March 30, 2021, the club announced that Postmates would become the second official sleeve sponsor (joining Target) on a one year deal for the entirety of the 2021 season.  Shortly thereafter, LAFC announced that YouTube TV no longer held exclusive broadcasting rights over English language home matches.  Instead, the club chose to partner with two local networks for all English language home games beginning that season.

For the club's the 2022 season, LAFC announced on February 26, 2022 that it had partnered with PepsiCo to make Rockstar energy drink the exclusive shirt sponsor of its 2022 training kit. The agreement expired at the end of the season.

Prior to the 2023 season, on June 14, 2022, MLS announced a new media rights partnership with Apple giving the tech giant exclusive broadcast rights to all league games via its streaming service, Apple TV, for the next 10 seasons. To promote this new partnership, as well as their new streaming service entitled MLS Season Pass, both MLS and Apple agreed to have the Apple TV+ logo appear on the left kit sleeve of all league teams beginning with the 2023 season. Additionally, Ford, LAFC's Official Domestic Automobile Partner, joined the club's top tier of sustained brand sponsorships - the "Golden Boot Club" - for the 2023 season. This enhanced partnership included Ford receiving promonent logo placement on the team's right kit sleeve.

Stadium

On May 17, 2015, the team chose the Los Angeles Memorial Sports Arena site to build a 22,000-seat state of the art stadium for the MLS in Exposition Park, estimated to cost $250 million. The group estimated the project would create 1,200 temporary construction jobs and 1,800 full-time jobs, generating $2.5 million in annual tax revenue. The environmental impact report, arena demolition, and stadium construction were expected to take three years and delay the team's debut to 2018.

On May 6, 2016, the Los Angeles City Council approved the stadium, clearing a way for the construction of the stadium.

A groundbreaking ceremony took place on August 23, 2016. At the event attended by owners and construction crews, LAFC announced a 15-year, $100 million naming rights deal for the stadium with the Banc of California. Demolition of the Los Angeles Memorial Sports Arena began shortly after the groundbreaking and was completed by October 2016.

The first public event at the stadium was an open practice and dedication ceremony held on April 18, 2018. The club's first home match was played on April 29, 2018, against Seattle Sounders FC, with the home side winning 1–0. The lone goal was scored by Laurent Ciman in stoppage time in front of a capacity crowd of 22,000.

The stadium was renamed to BMO Stadium on January 19, 2023.

Club culture

After the launch, supporters were consulted on many of the club's early decisions including the team colors, the look of the crest and the design of BMO Stadium, built on land previously held by the LA Sports Arena. Much of the marketing focus was to millennials, which led to the decision to play near downtown Los Angeles. LAFC took a grassroots approach to building the club by founding the LAFC academy and signing younger prospects including Americans Walker Zimmerman and  Tristan Blackmon, Portuguese draft pick João Moutinho, and Uruguayan prospect Diego Rossi.

Supporters

LAFC supporters are known collectively as "The 3252".  The official capacity of the safe standing supporters section at BMO Stadium is 3,252.  When added together, the numbers 3, 2, 5, 2 equal 12, serving as a reference to "the 12th man", and an homage to the supporters of the team. Composed of a variety of supporters groups, The 3252 is the club's independent supporters union, which encompasses a growing number of affiliate supporter groups and independent supporters with active season memberships.

Falcon program
The club's falcon program includes three live falcons who participate in various gameday and community events. One falcon is released pre-game by an honorary falconer (usually a celebrity or community figure) and flies around the stadium. The first honorary falconer was co-owner Will Ferrell.  The three falcons are named after famous streets in Los Angeles: "Olly" (Olvera Street), "Fig" (Figueroa Street), and "Mel" (Melrose Avenue).

Rivalries

LA Galaxy: LAFC's biggest and most hated rivals are the LA Galaxy, who play in the Los Angeles suburb of Carson. The series between the two teams is known as El Tráfico (Spanish for "The Traffic"), conversely, Spanish-language speakers and media commonly refer to it as the Clásico del Tráfico (English for the "Traffic Classic"). The nickname was coined by MLS fans and adopted by some media outlets following polls by SB Nation blogs LAG Confidential and Angels on Parade. It refers to the notorious traffic congestion in Los Angeles, among the worst in the United States and the world, while serving as a play on "El Clásico". MLS has no plans to trademark the name. The rivalry has also been called the "Los Angeles Derby", a moniker that was also used for the SuperClasico.

Seattle Sounders: LAFC's first game ever played was a 1-0 win over the Seattle Sounders on March 4, 2018, marking the earliest starting point of any of LAFC's on-field rivalries. LAFC's first-ever home game at Banc of California Stadium was also a 1-0 win over Seattle, ending in dramatic fashion with a 92nd-minute goal. The next season Seattle got its revenge, defeating LAFC for the first time in the 2019 Western Conference Finals, bringing L.A.'s record-setting season to an end. Beyond these touchstone moments, the rivalry has carried on players, coaches, and supporters.

Portland Timbers: LAFC also has an on-field rivalry with the Portland Timbers. The teams played two games in four days in July 2018, both at Banc of California Stadium. The first, a league match, ended in a scoreless draw; the second, a U.S. Open Cup quarterfinal, was a testy match that ended in a 3–2 Los Angeles victory. Their matches in 2019 led MLS writer Brian Taylor to call the matchup "a new rivalry…between Western Conference heavyweights"; LAFC swept the league matches 4–1 in Los Angeles and 3–2 in Portland, but the Timbers took revenge in the Open Cup with a 1–0 quarterfinal victory. LAFC clinched the Supporters' Shield in 2022 on Portland's turf in a 2−1 victory on matchweek 33.

At the international level, a budding new rivalry between LAFC and Club América (Liga MX) began when the two met in the 2020 CONCACAF Champions League semi-finals. LAFC defeated América 3-1, scoring all 3 goals in the 2nd half with a man down. Contentiousness on the playing field spilled over onto the sidelines at half-time, with Coaches of both teams getting into a physical altercation. In the aftermath, Coach Miguel "El Piojo" Herrera was fired by Club América. Mexican news outlets attributed the firing to the result of the LAFC game, serving as the last straw -- one source calling LAFC's win a "humiliation" of Club America and of Liga MX. Pitting together two teams located in two of the world's megacities, Mexico City and Los Angeles, which have the two largest Mexican/Mexican-American populations, has the potential of a huge and unique rivalry. LAFC and Club América met again at the 2022 Leagues Cup Showcase double-header event at SoFi Stadium in a "friendly" match where both fan groups fired off pyrotechnics from the stands.

Ownership
In 2016, three local investors—Brandon Beck, Larry Berg and Bennett Rosenthal—took over as managing owners of the club with Berg serving as lead managing owner.  As of 2017, Chairman and CEO of Mandalay Entertainment Group and entrepreneur Peter Guber is executive chairman, and venture capitalist Henry Nguyen is vice-chairman. The ownership group in 2019 also included businessman Ruben Gnanalingam. Other part-owners and investors include Will Ferrell, Natalie Mariduena, Nomar Garciaparra, Mia Hamm-Garciaparra, Chad Hurley, Magic Johnson, Joseph Tsai, Tucker Kain, Kirk Lacob, Mitch Lasky, Mark Leschly, Mike Mahan, Irwin Raij, Tony Robbins, Lon Rosen, Paul Schaeffer, Brandon Schneider, Allen Shapiro, Mark Shapiro, Jason Sugarman, Harry Tsao, and Rick Welts.

In February 2020, LAFC owners began the process of buying out a 20 percent ownership stake held by Malaysian businessman Vincent Tan. The buyout resulted in a $700 million valuation for the club, the largest on record for a Major League Soccer team at the time.

Broadcasting
From 2023, every LAFC match is available via MLS Season Pass on the Apple TV app, in addition to select matches simulcast linearly on Fox or FS1. Prior to this all-streaming deal, LAFC aired matches on a few stations and one other streaming platform.

In 2021 and 2022, all locally broadcast LAFC matches were televised in English by KCOP. Max Bretos served as the team's lead play-by-play announcer 

YouTube TV carried live games for the team from 2018 to 2020. It marked the first time that a major U.S. professional sports team sold their regional broadcast rights to an online streaming service rather than a traditional television broadcaster or regional sports network.

Prior to Apple, locally broadcast LAFC matches were televised in Spanish on Estrella TV station KRCA, with Francisco X. Rivera as the lead play-by-play announcer. Regular local radio coverage of LAFC matches is provided in English by KSPN (ESPNLA 710), with Dave Denholm serving as the radio play-by-play announcer. Spanish radio broadcasts are provided by KFWB (980), with Armando Aguayo as the play-by-play announcer. The club also partners with KIRN (670) as part of the station's weekly sports report.

Players and staff

Roster

Out on loan

Coaching staff

Team management

Honors

Team

In 2019, LAFC won their first major MLS trophy, the Supporter's Shield. They won it with a record breaking 72 points in just their second season in existence. In 2022, LAFC won their second Supporter's Shield, becoming the second club to win two shields within their first five seasons (after D.C. United). LAFC capped-off the 2022 season by winning the MLS Cup over the Philadelphia Union.

Players

Records

List of seasons

This is a partial list of the last five seasons completed by LAFC. For the full season-by-season history, see List of Los Angeles FC seasons.

1. Avg. attendance include statistics from league matches only.
2. Top goalscorer(s) includes all goals scored in League, MLS Cup Playoffs, U.S. Open Cup, MLS is Back Tournament, CONCACAF Champions League, FIFA Club World Cup, and other competitive continental matches.

Player records

Matches

Goals

Assists

Clean sheets

Development system

Academy
On February 1, 2016, the club announced the founding of the LAFC Academy. The academy is launching with a fully funded U12 USSDA academy team with a roster of 26 players. Todd Saldana currently serves as academy director.

On August 21, 2018, the U-13 squad won the CONCACAF Champions League, as champions of North America.

On July 8, 2020, LAFC signed its first three Homegrown players from the academy in Club history – Tony Leone, Christian Torres and Erik Dueñas.

Affiliates
Orange County SC, competing in the USL Championship, was affiliated with Los Angeles FC as part of a multi-year affiliation agreement with the team that started on December 7, 2016, and ended after the 2018 season. On March 12, 2021, LAFC announced their partnership with USL Championship club Las Vegas Lights.

LAFC launched a reserve team, Los Angeles FC 2 (or LAFC2), for the 2023 season of MLS Next Pro. The team plays at Titan Stadium and is currently coached by Enrique Duran.

References

External links

 
2014 establishments in California
Association football clubs established in 2014
Major League Soccer teams